Javindo, also known by the pejorative name Krontjong, was a Dutch-based creole language spoken on Java, Indonesia. The name Javindo is a portmanteau of Java and Indo, the Dutch word for a person of mixed Indonesian and Dutch descent. This contact language developed from communication between Javanese-speaking mothers and Dutch-speaking fathers in Indo families. Its main speakers were Indo-Eurasian people. Its grammar was based on Javanese, and its vocabulary was based on the Dutch lexicon but pronounced in a Javanese manner.

Even though most of the lexicon is derived from Dutch, the grammar of the language is mostly of Javanese origin, including elements such as morphology; lack of verbs; no past tense; no finite verb.

It should not be confused with Petjo, a different Dutch- and Malay-based creole also spoken by Indo-Eurasians. With the loss of the generation that lived in the Dutch East Indies era, that language has almost died out.

Notes

Further reading

Dutch-based pidgins and creoles
Extinct languages of Asia
Languages of Indonesia
Dutch language in Asia